Perth is an unincorporated community in Sumner County, Kansas, United States.  It is located about 9 miles southwest of Wellington near the intersection of S Clearwater Rd and W 80th St S, next to the railroad.

History
A post office was opened in Perth in 1882, and remained in operation until it was discontinued in 1954.

Education
The community is served by Wellington USD 353 public school district.

Notable people
 Edward Gallagher (1887–1940), head coach of Oklahoma State Cowboys wrestling where he won 11 national championships from 1916 to 1940, born in Perth.
 George Kelly (1905–1967), psychologist, therapist, educator, considered the father of cognitive clinical psychology. He was born on a farm near Perth.

References

Further reading

External links
 Sumner County map, KDOT

Unincorporated communities in Sumner County, Kansas
Unincorporated communities in Kansas